The BŻ-4 Żuk ("Beetle" in Polish), formerly known as GIL-4, was a Polish four-seat light helicopter built in the 1950s. Although it pioneered a novel rotor and transmission system, it never entered series production.

Design and development
Work on the GIL-4 began at the Główny Instytut Lotnictwa - Main Aviation Institute (GIL), in Warsaw in 1953, under the leadership of Dipl. Ing. Bronisław Żurakowski, who had earlier designed the experimental BŻ-1 GIL helicopter, the first successful rotating-wing aircraft built in Poland. Due to the delicate political situation in postwar Poland (Soviet influences and centrally planned economy), progress was slow. The main object was to produce a simple and inexpensive general use light helicopter and to further development of the novel rotor and transmission system, which eliminates vibration and improves control. .

The BŻ-4 Żuk was based on a single main three-blade rotor powered by an indigenous  Narkiewicz WN-4 piston engine in a fuselage made of a steel frame, behind a cabin section. It had an open frame rear boom structure and a fixed four-wheel undercarriage. Main rotor was atypical, for it had a smaller upper steering rotor and was fitted with an automatic stabilization system, of the Hiller principle. The cabin had four doors with two front seats and a rear bench. There were two fuel tanks, 220 L in total.

Four main variants were planned: a passenger version accommodating a pilot and three passengers, an ambulance variant carrying pilot, one stretchers and an attendant, an agricultural variant carrying pilot and spraying or dusting equipment and a dual control trainer.

Testing and evaluation
The first prototype of the BŻ-4 Żuk four-seat helicopter was manufactured and displayed publicly in the Polish Aviation Day Exhibition in August 1956. Due to a long program of ground testing and fixing faults, it flew first only on 10 February 1959 and completed 17 flights for a total of 3 hrs, 40 minutes. The Żuk was still in the development stage when further work was cancelled in favor of the licence production of the Mil Mi-1, that had already started in WSK PZL-Świdnik. The prototype was damaged during landing on 31 August 1959 and despite being repaired, was not used again. Two additional prototypes were not completed.

One damaged and incomplete prototype is preserved in the Polish Aviation Museum in Kraków.

Specifications (BŻ-4)

See also

References

Notes

Bibliography

 Babiejczuk, Janusz and Grzegorzewski, Jerzy. Polski Przemysł Lotniczy 1945-1973 (in Polish). Warsaw: Wydawnictwo MON, 1974. No ISBN.
 Cynk, J.B. "Pictorial Museum of Polish Aviation." Air Progress, Fall 1959.
 Krzyżan, Marian. Samoloty w Muzeach Polskich (in Polish). Warsaw: Wydawnictwa Komunikacji i Łącznośc, 1983. .
 Green, William and Pollinger, Gerald. The Observer's Book of Aircraft, 1958 edition. London: Fredrick Warne & Co. Ltd., 1958.
 Lambermont, Paul. Helicopters and Autogyros of the World. London: Cassell, 1958.

External links
Photo gallery

1950s Polish civil utility aircraft
1950s Polish experimental aircraft
1950s Polish helicopters
Aircraft manufactured in Poland
Aircraft first flown in 1959
Single-engined piston helicopters